Don't Be a Stranger may refer to:

 Don't Be a Stranger (Preston Reed album), a 1982 album by Preston Reed
 Don't Be a Stranger (Mark Eitzel album), a 2012 album by Mark Eitzel
 Don't Be a Stranger (Dina Carroll song), a 1993 song by Dina Carroll